Felimare lajensis is a species of sea slug or dorid nudibranch, a marine gastropod mollusc in the family Chromodorididae.

Distribution
This nudibranch is found in Brazil.

Description 
Felimare lajensis is dark blue in colour with a series of yellow longitudinal lines. The edge of the mantle is white and there is a series of darker blue spots on a blue background between the border and the first of the yellow lines. The rhinophores are entirely blue and the gills are also blue with very dark blue rachises. The maximum recorded body length is 30 mm.

Habitat 
Minimum recorded depth is 7.3 m. Maximum recorded depth is 25 m.

Feeding habits 
This species feeds on a blue species of sponge, Dysidea etheria.

References

Chromodorididae
Gastropods described in 1998
Molluscs of Brazil